The South African national cricket team visited Pakistan in October to November 1997 and played a three-match Test series against the Pakistani national cricket team. South Africa won the Test series 1–0. South Africa were captained by Hansie Cronje and Pakistan by Saeed Anwar. In addition, the teams played in a Limited Overs International (LOI) tournament which South Africa won.

Test series summary

1st Test

2nd Test

3rd Test

References

1997 in South African cricket
1997 in Pakistani cricket
South African cricket tours of Pakistan
International cricket competitions from 1997–98 to 2000
Pakistani cricket seasons from 1970–71 to 1999–2000